The first International Law and Economics Conference in Turkey, which was organized by Bilkent University Faculty of Law in Ankara (Turkey) between 25–26 April 2014. During the conference, speakers coming from 13 different countries made more than 40 presentations.

Organization Committee of the International Law and Economics Conference was composed of:
Osman B. Gürzumar Dean of the Faculty of Law of Bilkent University
Hans-Bernd Schäfer Professor at Bucerius Law School (Hamburg), Visiting Professor at the Faculty of Law of Bilkent University
Halil Baha Karabudak Instructor at the Faculty of Law of Bilkent University
Aslı E. Gürbüz Usluel Assoc. Dean of the Faculty of Law of Bilkent University
Hüseyin Can Aksoy (Conference Secretary), Instructor at the Faculty of Law of Bilkent University

Keynote lectures and invited speeches were delivered by:
Robert Cooter, Berkeley School of Law
William Kovacic, George Washington University
Timur Kuran, Duke University
David Levi-Faur, Hebrew University of Jerusalem
Stefan Voigt, Hamburg University

References

External links
Law.bilkent.edu.tr

Bilkent University
2014 conferences
2014 in Turkey